Aäläm-Wärqe Davidian, commonly credited as Alamork Davidian in English, is an Ethiopian-Israeli film director. Her directorial debut, Fig Tree, was an Ophir Award nominee for Best Picture in 2018.

Fig Tree was based in part on her own childhood in Addis Ababa prior to emigrating to Israel. She is married to film director and producer Kobi Davidian.

At the 2018 Toronto International Film Festival, she won the Eurimages Audentia Award for Best Female Director for Fig Tree.

References

External links

Ethiopian film directors
Israeli film directors
Ethiopian emigrants to Israel
People from Addis Ababa
Living people
Israeli women film directors
Year of birth missing (living people)